
In business, an intranet strategy is the use of an intranet and associated hardware and software to obtain one or more organizational objectives. An intranet is an access-restricted network used internally in an organization. An intranet uses the same concepts and technologies as the World Wide Web and Internet. This includes web browsers and servers running on the internet protocol suite and using Internet protocols such as FTP, TCP/IP, HTML, and Simple Mail Transfer Protocol (SMTP).

Role of intranets

Intranets are generally used for four types of applications:

1) Communication and collaboration
send and receive e-mail, faxes, voice mail, and paging
discussion rooms and chat rooms
audio and video conferencing
virtual team meetings and project collaboration
online company discussions as events (e.g., IBM Jams)
inhouse blogs

2) Web publishing
develop and publish hyperlinked multi-media documents such as:
policy manuals
company newsletters
product catalogs
technical drawings
training material
telephone directories

3) Business operations and management
order processing
inventory control
production setup and control
management information systems
database access

4) Intranet portal management
centrally administer all network functions including servers, clients, security, directories, and traffic
give users access to a variety of internal and external business tools/applications
integrate different technologies
conduct regular user research to identify and confirm strategy (random sample surveys, usability testing, focus groups, in-depth interviews with wireframes, etc.)

Why have an intranet strategy? 
Having a strategy pre-supposes a planned, orderly process with proper costing and budgeting, it involves consulting with the parties who are going to be using the intranet, allows for an efficient integration with existing systems and phasing-out of older ones, has long term benefits when the intranet needs to be scaled or made more secure, maintains control and quality in the hands of the designated department that "owns" it, and creates for the provision of feedback to monitor whether the "investment" is living up to the organization's expectations.

Potential advantages of using intranets

reduces printing, distribution, and paper costs - particularly on policy manuals, company newsletters, product catalogs, technical drawings, training material, and telephone directories 
easy to use - no specialized training required
inexpensive to use (once it is set up)
moderate initial setup costs (hardware and software)
standardized network protocol (TCP/IP), document protocol (HTML), and file transfer protocol (ftp) already well established and suitable for all platforms
can be used throughout the enterprise
reduces employee training costs
reduces sales and marketing costs
reduces office administration and accounting costs
ease of access results in a more integrated company with employees communicating and collaborating more freely and more productively

Potential disadvantages of intranets

it is an evolving technology that requires upgrades and could have software incompatibility problems
security features can be inadequate
inadequate system performance management and poor user support
may not scale up adequately
maintaining content can be time-consuming
some employees may not have PCs at their desks
The aims of the organisation in developing an intranet may not align with user needs (see: further reading)

See also
 extranet
 Information technology management
 internet
 intranet
 web portal
 marketing
 strategic management
 strategic planning
 management
 management information systems

References

 L. Tredinnick Jo, Why Intranets Fail (and How to Fix Them), Chandos Publishing, 2004
 N. Cox, Building and managing a Web services Team, New York: Van Nostrand Reinhold, 1997)

Information technology management